Jocelyn Wardrop-Moore (born 29 April 1932) is a British alpine skier. She competed in two events at the 1956 Winter Olympics held in Cortina d'Ampezzo, Italy. She finished 35th of 47 in the slalom and 42nd of 44 in the giant slalom.

References

1932 births
Living people
British female alpine skiers
Olympic alpine skiers of Great Britain
Alpine skiers at the 1956 Winter Olympics
People from Sevenoaks